Trichur S. Suryanarayanan is an Indian mycologist and a director of the Vivekananda Institute of Tropical Mycology (VINSTROM) and a former professor of mycology at Ramakrishna Mission Vivekananda College, Chennai. He has authored many articles and conducts research on mycology. He has done his degrees on mycology and has guided several students on mycology while as a professor at Ramakrishna Mission Vivekananda College.

He has specialized on fungal endophytes and has published several papers on mycology, fungal ecology and bioactive metabolites obtained from endophytic fungi.

References

External links
 https://www.semanticscholar.org/author/T.-S.-Suryanarayanan/34656200
 https://science.thewire.in/the-sciences/covid-19-and-black-fungus-what-is-mucormycosis/
 https://rkmvc.ac.in/vinstrom/publications/

Year of birth missing (living people)
Living people
Indian mycologists